The Angolan Men's Handball League is the top tier handball competition in Angola.

Summary

 Round robin tournament.

Participation details

Titles per club
Men

See also
 Federação Angolana de Andebol
 Angola men's national handball team
 Taça de Angola
 Supertaça de Angola

References

 
Handball competitions in Angola
Angola